Meriton is an Australian construction company and property developer.

Meriton may also refer to:
 Meriton (surname)
 Meriton Grand Hotel Tallinn, a hotel in Tallinn, Estonia
 Meriton Road Park, a park in Handforth, England